The 37th Virginia Cavalry Battalion was a cavalry battalion raised in Virginia for service in the Confederate States Army during the American Civil War. It fought mostly in western Virginia and the Shenandoah Valley.

Virginia's 37th Cavalry Battalion was organized in August, 1862, as Dunn's Partisan Rangers. The battalion contained four companies and in November was changed to regular cavalry. Co. E was organized on October 1, 1862. Co. F, from North Carolina, was organized on October 26, 1862. Co. H was organized on January 8, 1863, Co. G was organized February 6, 1863, and Co. I was organized on April 1, 1863. Co. K transferred from the 21st Virginia Cavalry before June 5, 1864. It was assigned to W.E. Jones', McCausland's and W.L. Jackson's Brigade. During April, 1864, it totalled 300 effectives and by June had increased its strength to ten companies. It was involved in various operations in western Virginia and East Tennessee, then saw action in the Shenandoah Valley. The unit disbanded in mid-April, 1865. Lieutenant Colonel Ambrose C. Dunn and Major J.R. Claiborne were in command.

See also

List of Virginia Civil War units
List of West Virginia Civil War Confederate units

References

Units and formations of the Confederate States Army from Virginia
1862 establishments in Virginia
Military units and formations established in 1862
1865 disestablishments in Virginia
Military units and formations disestablished in 1865